Lourdes Domínguez Lino took revenge for losing the final in last year and defeated the defending champion Flavia Pennetta 7–6(7–3), 6–4 in the final.

Seeds

Draw

Finals

Top half

Bottom half

References
 Official results archive (ITF)
 Official results archive (WTA)

Copa Colsanitas Seguros Bolivar - Singles
2006 Singles